Frederick W. Finn (born August 24, 1945) is an American attorney, businessman, and politician of the Democratic Party. He was a member of the Washington House of Representatives, representing the 35th district from 2009 to 2013.

References

1945 births
Living people
Democratic Party members of the Washington House of Representatives
Politicians from New York City